Maksim Agapov (ru: Максим Агапов; born 20 March 1988) is a Kyrgyzstani footballer who plays as a goalkeeper for Xorazm FK Urganch. He previously played for Neftchi Kochkor-Ata, but after the dissolution of the club, he moved to his current club.

Career

Club
In September 2014, Agapov returned to Dordoi Bishkek.

International
He is a member of the Kyrgyzstan national football team.

Career statistics

International

Statistics accurate as of match played 21 March 2013

Honours

Individual
Goalkeeper of the year (1): 2009

References

External links

1988 births
Living people
Kyrgyzstani footballers
Kyrgyzstan international footballers
Kyrgyzstani people of Russian descent
Footballers at the 2010 Asian Games
FC Dordoi Bishkek players
Association football goalkeepers
Asian Games competitors for Kyrgyzstan